The 1987 Nissan Mobil 500 was the tenth round of the inaugural World Touring Car Championship. The race was held for cars eligible for Group A touring car regulations. It was held on October 26, 1987, at the Wellington Street Circuit in the docks area of Wellington, New Zealand.

Official results

Italics indicate driver practiced this car but did not race.

References

Statistics
 Pole Position - #7 Klaus Ludwig - 1:29.42
 Fastest Lap - #6 Steve Soper - 1:32.28

External links
 www.touringcarracing.net
 Volvo 240 Turbo Group 'A' Racing Information

Auto races in New Zealand
Wellington 500
Wellington 500
October 1987 sports events in New Zealand
1980s in Wellington